"" ('Beloved Homeland') is the national anthem of Mozambique, approved by law in 2002 under Article 295 of the Constitution of Mozambique. It was written by Salomão J. Manhiça and replaced "Viva, Viva a FRELIMO" on 30 April 2002.

History
The anthem is the second Mozambique has adopted after its independence, the first being "Viva, Viva a FRELIMO". The lyrics of the latter were removed in the 1990s, then the Parliament adopted a new anthem, "Pátria Amada", in 2002. Despite the fact that nine people took part in making the song, as recently as 2013, the Republic's Assembly recognised Manhiça as the author of the anthem. However, there are sources that claim others contributed to "Pátria Amada", including Justino Sigaulane Chemane, who composed the music, and Mia Couto.

Lyrics
"Pátria Amada" has three verses, but usually only the first verse and chorus (which is repeated) are performed.

Notes

References

External links

Mozambique: Pátria Amada - Audio of the national anthem of Mozambique, with information and lyrics (archive link)
Vocal rendition

National symbols of Mozambique
Mozambican music
Mozambique
National anthems
National anthem compositions in F major